The Battle of Versailles Fashion Show was a historic fashion show held on November 28, 1973, in the Palace of Versailles to raise money for its restoration. 

Created by Eleanor Lambert and Versailles curator Gerald Van der Kemp, the show pitted French designers (Yves Saint Laurent, Pierre Cardin, Emanuel Ungaro, Marc Bohan, and Hubert de Givenchy) against American designers (Oscar de la Renta, Stephen Burrows, Halston, Bill Blass, and Anne Klein, who brought along her assistant, Donna Karan). 

With a guest list of 700 and notables such as Princess Grace, Marie-Hélène de Rothschild, Jacqueline de Ribes, Gloria Guinness, Andy Warhol, Liza Minnelli and Joséphine Baker the event became legendary. Each designer was to submit eight designs for consideration. The Parisian designers viewed their competition as mere sportswear designers. The American designers used eleven black models, an unprecedented number at the time.  The American designers and their models stole the show, providing a youthful approach and stunning the primarily French audience.

In 2011, the Huffington Post Game Changer Awards honored the African American models of Versailles with the Style Award. The models included Pat Cleveland, Bethann Hardison, Billie Blair, Jennifer Brice, Alva Chinn, Norma Jean Darden, Charlene Dash, Barbara Jackson, Ramona Saunders, and Amina Warsuma.

In 2012, filmmaker Deborah Riley Draper chronicled the event in the feature documentary, Versailles '73: American Runway Revolution.  The film included designer Stephen Burrows, French Chambre Syndicale President Didier Grumbach, and many of the models, journalists and guest who attended the event in 1973.

In 2016 another documentary "Battle at Versailles" was made by the fashion network M2M, chronicling the event. The film was narrated by Stanley Tucci and featured many of the event's participants. 

A fictionalized version of the Battle is depicted in the television miniseries Halston, which premiered May 2021 on Netflix.

References

External links
 Clarissa Cruz, "The Bold and the Beautiful: 3 Women Who Paved the Way for Black Models", O, The Oprah Magazine, May 2012.
 "Versailles '73:  American Runway Revolution".
 "Versailles '73:  American Runway Revolution" panel discussion from Archive on Demand
 "The Battle of Versailles: Robin Givhan in conversation with Patricia Mears" from Archive on Demand
 "A Black Model in Paris"

Fashion events in France
African-American cultural history
1973 in France
1973 in fashion
November 1973 events in Europe